Bayt Susin was a Palestinian Arab village in the Ramle Subdistrict of Mandatory Palestine, located  southeast of Ramla. In 1945, it had 210 inhabitants. The village was depopulated during the 1948 war by the Israeli 7th Brigade.

Geography
Situated on a hilltop on the southern slopes of a mountainous area, Bayt Susin overlooked a wide area to its south and west. Below the village, two wadis, streaming from the slopes, met. The village stood near a network of roads that led to many urban centers and was linked by a secondary road to the Jaffa-Jerusalem Highway.

History
Surrounding Bayt Susin were the ruins of a wall and cemeteries, cut stones, the foundations of houses, cisterns, and a basin. The Crusaders referred to the village as "Bezezin".

Ottoman era
While under the rule of the Ottoman Empire, in 1596, Bayt Susin was under the administration of the nahiya ("subdistrict") of Ramla, part of the Sanjak of Gaza, with a population of 50 households and 6 bachelors, all Muslims.  They paid taxes on wheat, olives, and barley, as well as beehives and goats.

In 1838,  Beit Susin was noted as  Muslim village, in the  Er-Ramleh district.

The American Biblical scholar Edward Robinson passed by Bayt Susin in 1852 and described it as a small and ancient village. An Ottoman village list from about 1870 showed that   Beit Susin  had  a population of 21, with a total of  11 houses, though the population count included men, only.

In 1883, the PEF's Survey of Western Palestine (SWP)  found here "foundations and ruined walls. A good perennial well, called Bir el Haurah, on the south and springs in the valley."

British Mandate era

In a census conducted in 1922 by the British Mandate authorities, Bait Susin  had a population of 47 inhabitants; all Muslims,  increasing in the 1931 census to 70, still all Muslims, in a total of 14 houses.

Bayt Susin was classified as a hamlet by the Palestine Index Gazeteer. In the British Mandate period, it was divided into two sections. The larger section had a rectangular, north–south plan and the smaller laid  to the southwest. Its houses were constructed of masonry and a mosque was located close to the village's smaller section. The residents used the spring to obtain water for domestic purposes. The primary economic sectors were agriculture (grain being the chief cash crop) and animal husbandry.

In the 1945 statistics, the population of Bayt Susin was 210, all Muslims,  with a total land area of 6,481 dunams of which 5,453 were Arab-owned. The remainder was classified as public property.  Bayt Susin grew grains on 5,108 dunams and 94 dunams were either irrigated or used for orchards, while 8 dunams were built-up (urban) areas.

1948 war and aftermath

According to Israeli New Historian, Benny Morris, Bayt Susin was captured and depopulated on 20 April 1948, at the beginning of Israel's offensive, Operation Nachshon. However, Palestinian historian Aref al-Aref wrote an attempt at capturing the village occurred on 22 May, but failed due to both strong resistance from the local militia and false knowledge that it had been evacuated of its inhabitants. According to Israeli officers, on May 23 Bayt (Beit) Susin was occupied by Arab Legion and irregulars, which was unknown to Jewish commanders. The village was a source of flanking fire at the Jewish forces when they attacked Latrun on May 23.

During Operation Bin Nun Alef—which was aimed at taking the Latrun salient and ended in an Israeli failure— Arab counterattacks were launched from Bayt Susin. In preparation of Operation Bin Nun Bet, Israeli soldiers from 72nd Battalion of the Sheva Brigade cleared the village on 28 May. It is not known if Bayt Susin was destroyed after its capture, but most Arab villages occupied in the Latrun salient were leveled. The Burma Road that the Israelis started to build a few days later to supply Jerusalem crossed the village.

On 20 August 1948, Bayt Susin was one (of 32) depopulated Palestinian villages which were proposed by David Ben-Gurion for new Jewish settlements. The moshav of Ta'oz was established on Bayt Susin's lands, but southwest of the village site, in 1950. According to Palestinian historian Walid Khalidi, whose researchers visited the site in 1990,  Bayt Susin "has been leveled by bulldozers; grass and thorns cover the remaining rubble... and the remains of walls from houses can be seen on the southern edge, where carob, pine, and cedar trees grow."

See also
 Meir Tobianski

References

Bibliography

External links
 Welcome to Bayt-Susin
Bayt Susin,  Zochrot
Survey of Western Palestine, Map 17:  IAA, Wikimedia commons

Arab villages depopulated prior to the 1948 Arab–Israeli War
District of Ramla